Time Trackers is a children's television series produced for the Seven Network in Australia and TV2 in New Zealand. The 13 half-hour episodes first screened in 2008. The series is a co-production of Gibson Group in New Zealand and Taylor Media in Australia.

Premise
Teenagers from different periods of history join forces to fight viruses threatening the history of human inventions.

Cast and characters

Main cast
Joe Dekkers-Reihana as Captain Wiremu Love
Kazimir Sas as Troy
Felicity Milovanovich as Carmen
Marcus Graham as Kevin (Dult version 10.1 and reprogrammed as a version 12.4)
Vaughan Slinn as Stuart (Dult version 10.1)
Jon English as Old Troy
Georgia Rippin as the Narrator
David Smyth as the voice of Balls (robot dog)

Guest cast
Igor Sas as Galileo
Angus Sampson as Leonardo da Vinci
Erroll Shand as Isaac Newton
Emmett Skilton as Ernest Rutherford

Episodes

See also
 List of Australian television series

References

External links

2008 Australian television series debuts
2008 Australian television series endings
2008 New Zealand television series debuts
2008 New Zealand television series endings
Australian time travel television series
New Zealand time travel television series
Androids in television
Australian children's television series
New Zealand children's television series
Seven Network original programming
Television shows filmed in New Zealand
Television shows funded by NZ on Air
Television series about teenagers
TVNZ 2 original programming